This is an alphabetical list of shopping centres in Hong Kong.

Most of Hong Kong's shopping centres are in the new towns in the New Territories.

Many Hong Kong shopping centres are attached to housing estates or commercial office towers.

List

 11 SKIES, Chek Lap Kok
 Allied Plaza, Prince Edward
 Amoy Plaza, Amoy Gardens, Kowloon Bay
 apm, Millennium City 5, Kwun Tong
 Butterfly Plaza, Tuen Mun
 Causeway Bay Plaza, Causeway Bay
 Chater House, Central
 Cheung Fat Plaza, Tsing Yi
 Cheung Sha Wan Plaza, Cheung Sha Wan
 China Hong Kong City, Tsim Sha Tsui
 Choi Ming Shopping Centre, Tiu Keng Leng
 Choi Yuen Plaza, Sheung Shui
 Chuk Yuen Plaza, Wong Tai Sin
 Chung Fu Plaza, Tin Shui Wai
 Chung On Shopping Centre, Ma On Shan
 Citygate Outlets, Tung Chung
 Citylink Plaza, Sha Tin New Town
 Cityplaza, Taikoo Shing
 Citywalk, Tsuen Wan
 Concord Square, Tsuen Wan
 Discovery Park, Tsuen Wan (D-PARK)
 Domain, Yau Tong
 Dragon Centre, Sham Shui Po
 E Plaza, Kwun Tong
 East Point City, Hang Hau
 The Edge, Tseung Kwan O
 Elements, Jordan
 EMAX, Kowloonbay International Trade & Exhibition Centre, Kowloon Bay
 Fashion Walk
 Festival Walk, Kowloon Tong
 Fortune City One, City One, Sha Tin
 Fu Tung Plaza, Tung Chung
 Golden Computer Centre and Golden Computer Arcade, Sham Shui Po
 Harbour City, Tsim Sha Tsui
 Hing Wah Plaza, Chai Wan
 Home Square, Shatin
 Hysan Place, Causeway Bay
 Infinitus Plaza, Sheung Wan
 International Finance Centre, Central
 Island Beverley, Causeway Bay
 iSQUARE, Tsim Sha Tsui
 K11, Tsim Sha Tsui
 K11 Musea, Tsim Sha Tsui
 Kolour Tsuen Wan, Tsuen Wan
 Kolour Yuen Long, Yuen Long
 Kornhill Plaza, Tai Koo
 Kowloon City Plaza, Kowloon City
 Kwai Chung Plaza, Kwai Chung
 Kwai Fong Plaza, Kwai Chung
 The Landmark, Central
 Landmark North, Sheung Shui
 La Cite Noble, Hang Hau
 Langham Place, Mong Kok
 Lek Yuen Plaza, Sha Tin
 Lei Yue Mun Plaza, Yau Tong
 Lok Fu Plaza, Wang Tau Hom, Wong Tai Sin
 Lucky Plaza, Sha Tin
 Luk Yeung Galleria, Tsuen Wan
 Lung Cheung Plaza (‘Lung Cheong Mall’), Wong Tai Sin
 Ma On Shan Plaza, Ma On Shan
 Man Yee Building
 Maritime Bay Commercial Centre, Hang Hau
 Maritime Square, Tsing Yi Island
 MediLink Square, Yau Ma Tei
 Megabox, Kowloon Bay
 Metro City, Tseung Kwan O
 Metro Town, Tseung Kwan O
 Metroplaza, Kwai Chung
 Mikiki, San Po Kong
 Ming Tak Shopping Centre, Tseung Kwan O
 Mira Mall, Tsim Sha Tsui
 Miramar Shopping Centre, Tsim Sha Tsui
 Moko, Mong Kok
 Nam Fung Plaza, Hang Hau
 Nan Fung Centre, Tsuen Wan
 New Jade Shopping Arcade, Chai Wan
 New Town Plaza, Sha Tin
 New Town Plaza Phase 3, Sha Tin
 Ngan Shing Commercial Centre, City One Shatin, Shatin
 Ocean Terminal, Hong Kong, Tsim Sha Tsui
 Olympian City, Tai Kok Tsui
 On Tat Shopping Centre, On Tat
 OP Mall, Tsuen Wan
 The ONE, Tsim Sha Tsui
 Pacific Place, Admiralty
 Panda Place, Tsuen Wan
 Park Central, Tseung Kwan O
 Pioneer Centre, Prince Edward
 Plaza Hollywood, Diamond Hill
 Popcorn, Tseung Kwan O
 Prince's Building, Central
 Provident Square, North Point
 The Pulse, Repulse Bay
 QRE Plaza, Wan Chai
 Sha Tin Centre, Sha Tin
 Sha Tin Plaza, Sha Tin
 Shui Chuen O Plaza, Sha Tin
 Sino Centre, Mong Kok
 Siu Sai Wan Plaza, Siu Sai Wan
 Skyline Plaza, Tsuen Wan
 SkyMart, Hong Kong International Airport
 Sogo Hong Kong, Causeway Bay
 Sogo Hong Kong, Tsim Sha Tsui
 Stanley Plaza,  Stanley
 The Sun Arcade, Tsim Sha Tsui
 Sun Yuen Long Centre, Yuen Long
 Sunshine City Plaza, Ma On Shan
 Tai Po Mega Mall, Tai Po
 Tai Wo Plaza, Tai Po
 Tak Tin Plaza, Kwun Tong
 Telford Plaza, Kowloon Bay
 Time Plus, Causeway Bay
 Times Square, Causeway Bay
 Tin Yiu Plaza, Yuen Long
 TKO Gateway, Hang Hau
 Tseung Kwan O Plaza, Tseung Kwan O
 Tsuen Wan Plaza, Tsuen Wan
 Tuen Mun Town Plaza, Tuen Mun
 Tung Ying Building, Tsim Sha Tsui
 Tze Wan Shan Shopping Centre, Tsz Wan Shan
 Up Town Plaza, Tai Po
 Upper Ngau Tau Kok Estate Shopping Centre, Ngau Tau Kok
 Wai Wah Centre, Sha Tin
 West 9 Zone, Mong Kok
 Wo Che Plaza, Sha Tin
 Wonderful Worlds of Whampoa, Whampoa Garden, Hung Hom
 Temple Mall South, Wong Tai Sin
 Windsor House, Causeway Bay
 WTC More, Causeway Bay
 Yat Tung Shopping Centre, Tung Chung 
 YOHO Town, Yuen Long

References

See also

 Shopping in Hong Kong
 List of buildings and structures in Hong Kong

Shopping centres
Hong Kong